State property refers to state or public ownership of an enterprise or asset.

State property may also refer to:

 State Property (band), an American rap group led by Beanie Sigel
 State Property (film), a 2002 American crime film starring Beanie Sigel
 State Property (soundtrack), a soundtrack album from the film